The 1883 Peninsula by-election was a by-election held on 22 January 1883 during the 8th New Zealand Parliament in the Otago electorate of .

The by-election was caused by the death of the incumbent MP James Seaton on 10 November 1882. The by-election was won by William Larnach.

He was opposed by Bishop Moran and Michael Donnelly. One sub-headline on the result of the election was "Bishop defeated". Another report expected a "close run" between Larnarch and Donnelly, but the Bishop came second.

Results
The following table gives the election result:

Notes

Peninsula 1883
1883 elections in New Zealand
January 1883 events
Politics of Otago